Oladapo Olufemi Oluyi (born 5 November 1988) is a Nigerian footballer. He plays as a central or defensive midfielder.

Career
Olufemi played in Europe for R.S.C. Anderlecht. In July 2007 he moved from the Brussels-based club to Portuguese club Boavista F.C.; He later left and was a free agent. During summer 2009 he went on trial; at IK Start, a Norwegian top-division club, where Solomon Owello was plying his trade. He impressed and was signed on a three and a half year contract. He signed with Shooting Stars in May 2013, and in December 2013, moved to league rivals Bayelsa United.

International career
Olufemi represented Nigeria at the 2007 FIFA U-20 World Cup in Canada and won a silver medal in the football event at the Summer Olympics in Beijing, however he did not appear in the tournament.

He earned his first cap for Nigeria in a friendly match against Sudan on 9 January 2008.

Career statistics

References

1988 births
Living people
Association football midfielders
Nigerian footballers
Nigeria under-20 international footballers
Nigeria international footballers
Enyimba F.C. players
R.S.C. Anderlecht players
Boavista F.C. players
IK Start players
Shooting Stars S.C. players
Bayelsa United F.C. players
Kwara United F.C. players
Eliteserien players
Primeira Liga players
Nigerian expatriate footballers
Expatriate footballers in Belgium
Nigerian expatriate sportspeople in Norway
Expatriate footballers in Portugal
Footballers at the 2008 Summer Olympics
Olympic footballers of Nigeria
Olympic silver medalists for Nigeria
Nigerian expatriate sportspeople in Portugal
Belgian Pro League players
Olympic medalists in football
Medalists at the 2008 Summer Olympics
Yoruba sportspeople
Sportspeople from Ibadan